The Organizing Committee of the Olympic and Paralympic Games Rio 2016 was the organizing committee for the 2016 Summer Olympic and Paralympic Games in Brazil.

Board members
The board members were:
 Carlos Arthur Nuzman - President

References

External links
  

2016 Summer Olympics
2016 Summer Paralympics
Organising Committees for the Olympic Games
Organising Committees for the Paralympic Games
2009 establishments in Brazil